The 2015–16 PBA season was the 41st season of the Philippine Basketball Association. The league continued to use the three-conference format, starting with the Philippine Cup. The Commissioner's Cup and the Governors' Cup were the second and third conferences of the season.

This season was also the first season of Chito Narvasa as the PBA commissioner when Chito Salud announced his resignation at the end of the 2014–15 season. Salud remained with the PBA as he was the new president and CEO of the league. However, on December 1, 2015, Salud announced his resignation as president and CEO of the PBA that took effect at the end of December 2015, passing both President and CEO positions to Narvasa.

The first event of the season was the 2015 PBA draft which was held on August 23.

This season currently holds the record for most games played in a season, having 266 games played throughout the whole year. It surpassed the previous record of 257 games, previously set during the previous season.

Executive board
 Chito Narvasa (Commissioner/President/CEO) 
 Robert Non (Chairman, representing San Miguel Beermen)
 Eric Arejola (Vice-chairman, representing GlobalPort Batang Pier)
 Ramoncito Fernandez (Treasurer, representing NLEX Road Warriors)

Teams

* - Participated for the 2015–16 PBA Philippine Cup
** - Barako Bull was sold to Phoenix Petroleum in January 2016. Participated beginning the 2016 PBA Commissioner's Cup.

Arenas

Like several Metro Manila-centric leagues, most games are held at arenas within Metro Manila, and sometimes, Antipolo. Games outside this area are called "out-of-town" games, and are usually played on Saturdays. Provincial arenas usually host one game, rarely two; these arenas typically host only once per season, but could return occasionally.

Main arenas

Out-of-town arenas
Aside from games outside Metro Manila and Antipolo, the PBA played two games outside the Philippines, in Dubai. It was the third time the league held games in the United Arab Emirates.

Transactions

Retirement
August 23, 2015: Danny Ildefonso officially announced his retirement after playing 17 seasons in the PBA.
August 25, 2015: T.Y. Tang officially announced his retirement after playing 7 seasons in the PBA, all of them with the Rain or Shine franchise.
October 14, 2015: Paul Artadi officially announced his retirement after playing 12 seasons in the PBA. His retirement was announced upon submitting his certificate of candidacy to run as councilor for San Juan in the 2016 elections.
November 25, 2015: Don Allado officially announced his retirement after playing 16 seasons in the PBA.

Coaching changes

Offseason
 July 20, 2015: Barangay Ginebra San Miguel fired head coach Frankie Lim. He was replaced by Star Hotshots coach Tim Cone. Cone's assistant from Star, Richard del Rosario, joins him in his transfer to Ginebra, as well.
 July 20, 2015: Assistant coach Jason Webb was promoted as the head coach of the Star Hotshots.

Commissioner's Cup
 April 28, 2016: Coach Chito Victolero resigned as interim head coach of Manny Pacquiao of the Mahindra Enforcer.
 April 29, 2016: The Mahindra Enforcer appointed Chris Gavina as their first assistant coach to replace the interim head coach slot vacated by resigned Chito Victolero.
 May 31, 2016: The Phoenix Fuel Masters hired Ariel Vanguardia as replacement for head coach Koy Banal.

Notable events

Pre-season
 July 16: Columbian Autocar Corporation (CAC) announced that they had changed their team name from Kia Carnival to Mahindra Enforcer.
 September 19: PBA Commissioner Chito Narvasa officially banned sportswriter Snow Badua from covering the league's activities due to his personal "baseless" attacks against Barangay Ginebra board governor Alfrancis Chua.
 October 14: The PBA Board, unanimously approved the memo that supported the Gilas Pilipinas in their participation in the Olympic qualifying tournament, that was held in July 2016, in lieu of this, 17 PBA players constituted the player pool of the Tab Baldwin-mentored national squad.
 October 14: The board of governors approved to adjust the league calendar to accommodate the preparation of the Philippines men's national basketball team for the 2016 FIBA World Olympic Qualifying Tournament. The Commissioner's Cup was extended until May 2016, then the league took a break for the duration of the qualifiers. The season's Governors' Cup will be held after the qualifiers and will finish around October 2016.
 The PBA launched their first 3x3 basketball tournament that catered for women's basketball players on October 23. Each active PBA team was represented by one women's team composed of four players. The women's 3x3 tournament games were to be played in between of the first and second games of the Wednesday and Friday gamedays.

Philippine Cup
The Talk 'N Text Tropang Texters silently changed their name to TNT Tropang Texters. This is after their mother company, Talk 'N Text was rebranded as "TNT" last September 2015.
PBA Commissioner Chito Narvasa imposed an indefinite ban to Mahindra team consultant Joe Lipa, after the latter accused Narvasa of issuing degrading remarks against Mahindra player-coach Manny Pacquiao during a press conference in Dubai. Narvasa made a mandatory summon over Lipa's remarks, but Lipa did not honor it.
December 1: PBA President and CEO Chito Salud resigned from his post effective December 31. He was replaced by current PBA chairman Robert Non who took over as president and CEO until the board finds his replacement.
During an out of town game between Barangay Ginebra San Miguel and Blackwater Elite at the AUF Gymnasium, Pampanga, Barangay Ginebra board governor Alfrancis Chua was seen using an e-cigarette while on the team's bench. Since the game was broadcast live on national television, the Department of Health, the Philippine Sports Commission and Angeles University Foundation officials requested the PBA to take action on prohibiting the use of e-cigarettes on the team bench. On December 13, 2015, PBA Commissioner Chito Narvasa issued a reprimand against Alfrancis Chua for the vaping incident.
In the final eight seconds of the overtime period of the knockout quarterfinal game between Barangay Ginebra San Miguel and GlobalPort Batang Pier, review showed that Stanley Pringle held the ball for over 5 seconds, which would have resulted in a five-second violation, but no call was made. After the final buzzer, the Batang Pier already went to the dugout, but Ginebra stayed behind. Ginebra fans, which were more than half of the crowd, were left stunned along with players and the Ginebra coaching staff. Head coach Tim Cone immediately went to center court and pleaded with the referees for a call or a review of the final 8-second possession of Globalport. He then went to the scorer's table and signed the official scorecard, signifying the team's intent to file a protest with the game's result. He stayed mum after coming out of the dugout on whether they would actually file a protest. Under the league's rules, Barangay Ginebra had until 12 noon of December 28, 2015, to file a letter of protest together with a bond, which requires a minimum of P20,000. 
Barangay Ginebra did not send a formal protest to the PBA office as the 12 noon deadline lapsed on December 28. Commissioner Chito Narvasa said that the league summoned the four referees of the Ginebra-GlobalPort game, Edward Aquino, Rommel Gruta, Mardy Montoya and Bing Oliva, on December 29 and re-evaluated their performance during the quarterfinal game.
According to the findings of the PBA technical committee on December 29, two violations were not called: the five-second ball-hogging violation and the backcourt violation committed by Stanley Pringle. Referees Edward Aquino and Rommel Gruta were therefore suspended for the rest of the Philippine Cup.
A total of 16 technical fouls were called during Game 2 of the semifinals series between the Alaska Aces and the GlobalPort Batang Pier on January 6, 2016. An in-game scuffle started when Alaska's Calvin Abueva helped to lift Dondon Hontiveros and bumped GlobalPort's Jay Washington who is helping Anthony Semerad to stand up. Team officials from both sides tried to pacify the players, including commissioner Chito Narvasa. Alaska was assessed with 8 technicals (Abueva, Hontiveros, Manuel, team manager/governor Dickie Bachmann, head coach Alex Compton, and assistant coaches Louie Alas, Monch Gavieres and Jeffrey Cariaso) while GlobalPort got 5 technical fouls (Washington, Semerad, team governor Erick Arejola, head coach Pido Jarencio and team manager Bonnie Tan). Three more technical fouls were called against GlobalPort's Joseph Yeo, Dorian Peña, and Jay Washington on separate plays. The number of technical fouls for this game tied the record of most number of technical fouls called in a single game, tying the record set during a game between the Alaska Milkmen and the Shell Turbo Chargers on October 25, 1997.
On January 7, a total of P91,200 in fines were slapped to Alaska and GlobalPort players and officials after the scuffle that happened during Game 2 of their semifinals series. Calvin Abueva got the highest fine with P41,600.
Blackwater Elite women's basketball team consisting of Allana Lim, Camille Sambile, France Mae Cabinbin and Camilla Denise Escoto clinched the inaugural title of the PBA Dickies Women's 3-in-3 tournament in Finals Game 2 against Brgy. Ginebra San Miguel held last January 9, 2016.
The PBA Board of Governors unanimously approve the sale of Barako Bull Energy's franchise to oil firm Phoenix Petroleum on January 20. In addition, the board also got the green light to Phoenix to play in the 2016 PBA Commissioner's Cup instead of waiting until the 2016–17 season. The new team was named Phoenix Fuel Masters.

Commissioner's Cup
February 3: Tropang TNT's import Ivan Johnson was suspended for one game and fined P50,000 after an altercation with JP Erram and Frank Golla during their practice game against Blackwater on January 30.
The TNT Tropang Texters silently changed their name to Tropang TNT. The team's new logo debuted on February 10 against Blackwater.
February 13: Ivan Johnson was again fined P250,000 and slapped with a lifetime ban after cursing PBA commissioner Chito Narvasa as he was leaving the playing court after being ejected for incurring his second flagrant foul penalty one at the 2nd quarter of their game against Meralco. The decision was announced during the game's halftime break. The penalty was downgraded into a season ban and P150,000 after Johnson voluntarily appeared on February 17 before Commissioner Narvasa and personally apologized for the infraction during the TNT-Meralco game.
February 23: Rhose Montreal, the league's Business Development Director since 2008 filed her resignation to the PBA Board of Governors effective immediately. Her resignation came on the heels of an investigative report from PBA-banned sportswriter Snow Badua, that questions the authenticity of Montreal's AB Philosophy diploma from the University of the Philippines. On March 7, the PBA Board decided to rehire Montreal as the Business Development Director of the league, for humanitarian reasons, after a lengthy discussion. PBA chairman Robert Non clarified in a press conference held on March 13 that Montreal was rehired on two conditions: she forfeited her benefits accumulated from 2008 until her resignation and was put on a 6-month probationary period.
March 7: League commissioner Chito Narvasa appointed as the new CEO of the PBA, replacing officer-in-charge Robert Non. The President/CEO position was eventually dissolved before the start of the Governors' Cup.
The league's Board of Governors through a board resolution requested the assistance of the National Bureau of Investigation to investigate on who leaked the scholastic records of their marketing director, Rhose Montreal to the media. All rank-and-file employees including Commissioner Chito Narvasa was subjected for investigation.
March 31: The PBA issued a memorandum order that prevent players who have boy-cut hairdos to play in the PBA Women's 3x3 Basketball tournament, the memorandum has received negative feedback from the players and the Gabriela's women's group for being "discriminatory". Commissioner Narvasa defended the league's decision to ban boy-cut hairdos in the women's league.

Governors' Cup
July 3: Gilbert Bulawan died after collapsing while on team practice with Blackwater Elite. He was declared dead on arrival at Capitol Medical Center in Quezon City, Philippines. He is the youngest and very first active player to die in the PBA.
July 13: The PBA announced the inclusion of female referees in the league's referees pool starting this Governor's Cup, the first in league's history. Edith Botecario and Janine Nicandro, who both graduated in the PBA Referees Academy and once officiated PBA D-League games, became part of the referees that officiated the games. Nicandro was one of the three referees of the conference's first match-up between Meralco Bolts and Phoenix Fuel Masters on July 15, 2016, while Botecario officiated the game between Blackwater Elite and NLEX Road Warriors the following day.
July 14: PBA-banned sportswriter Snow Badua reported that PBA Communications Director Willie Marcial-owned Chevrolet Trailblazer has illegally using a number 8 plate, a protocol license plate used only by members of the House of Representatives.
The Phoenix Fuel Masters silently changed their team logo and color scheme. Their new uniforms and logo debuted on July 15.
July 16: The Blackwater Elite retired the jersey number of Gilbert Bulawan (#11) before their game against the NLEX Road Warriors. The glass-encased jersey was presented to his wife, Dr. Icey Bulawan by team governor Siliman Sy and Reil Cervantes. As part of their tribute, the Elite will wear a black #11 patch on their jerseys and will dedicate the whole conference to Bulawan.
The Tropang TNT silently changed their name to TNT Katropa. The team's new logo debuted on July 20 against Rain or Shine.
August 21: Mark Cardona was rushed to the hospital after a suicide attempt. Cardona, who was a reserve player for the NLEX Road Warriors during that time, apparently tried to take his life by consuming a huge amount of prescription pills. A day prior on the incident, he made headlines in TV Patrol after his partner filed a complaint at a Quezon City police station for alleged domestic violence.
October 6: PBA referee Edward Aquino was removed from the pool of referees as confirmed by the league's media bureau chief Willie Marcial. Two other referees, Rommel Gruta and Reynaldo Yante were relegated to the PBA D-League.
October 9: During the game 2 of the finals series between the Meralco Bolts and the Barangay Ginebra San Miguel, Jimmy Alapag of the Bolts sank a three-pointer during the second quarter to surpass the 17-year record of 1,242 career triples made by Allan Caidic and become the all-time leader for most three-pointers made in a career.

Rule changes
The PBA board approved the rule changes for implementation starting this season:

Deliberate foul – Any player who commits a foul against an opponent by going after the man instead of the ball but without intent to hurt shall be assessed with a deliberate foul which shall result in awarding of two free throws to the offended player plus ball possession to the offended player's team. No 3-minute sit out for the player who committed the deliberate foul. A deliberate foul committed in the last two minutes of the fourth quarter and overtime period(s) shall be subject to automatic video review.
Shot clock reset — The shot clock shall be reset to 14 seconds if the ball goes to the offensive team after a legal attempt.
Free throw — During a free throw, a player can only enter the free-throw lane ("restricted area") after the ball has hit the rim.
Landing spot rule
Leaving a foot on the landing spot of a shooter – if without contact — Flagrant Foul Penalty 1 (FFP1) is called; two Free Throws are awarded; ball possession is retained by the team of offended player; and the offender is sent to the penalty box for three minutes for first offense. Second and subsequent offenses of players from the same team results in a five-minute penalty. A fine of at least Php 5,000.00 is assessed.
Leaving a foot on the landing spot of a shooter – if with contact -Flagrant Foul Penalty 2 (FFP2) is called; two Free Throws are awarded; ball possession is retained by the team of offended player; and the offender is ejected from the game. A fine of at least Php 20,000.00 is assessed, whatever is the consequence of the contact and an automatic, minimum one-game suspension is imposed to the offender.
Review of goal tending violation under the last two minutes — Any goal tending violation called in the last two minutes of the fourth quarter and overtime period(s) shall be subject to automatic video review. When a foul is called on a shot and a player touches the ball, basket or backboard and there is a chance to score, even if the referees do not call a goal tending violation, it shall likewise be subject to automatic review if it occurred in the last two minutes of the fourth quarter and overtime period(s).

In addition, the league modified its shot clock rules, adopting a procedure similar to the NBA and Euroleague, featuring tenths of a second. The shot clock should also display the time remaining in the game.  A portable shot clock that is capable of displaying tenths of a second and the time remaining in the game is temporarily installed if the in-venue shot clock is not capable to adopt the new shot clock rule or if the shot clock does not also display the game clock.  The time the shot clock changes to tenths is determined by the venue and the brand of clock used.  The Mall of Asia Arena uses the NBA and Euroleague rule (final five seconds) since its opening, as its Daktronics unit is the same model used by NBA (most venues, 2011–16) and Euroleague venues (Gran Canaria Arena). The Smart Araneta Coliseum's clock registers tenths in the final ten seconds.

Opening ceremonies
The opening ceremonies for this season was held at the Mall of Asia Arena in Pasay on October 21, 2015. The first game of the Philippine Cup between the Star Hotshots and Rain or Shine Elasto Painters immediately followed.
The opening was supposed to be held on October 18 at the Smart Araneta Coliseum in Quezon City but was suspended due to the onslaught of Typhoon Lando (international name: Koppu). This was the first time that the league cancelled its opening ceremonies due to bad weather.

The muses for the participating teams are as follows:

2015–16 PBA Philippine Cup

Elimination round

Playoffs

Quarterfinals

1st phase

|}*Team has twice-to-beat advantage. Team #1 only has to win once, while Team #2 has to win twice.

2nd phase

Semifinals

|}

Finals

|}
Finals MVP: Chris Ross 
Best Player of the Conference: June Mar Fajardo

2016 PBA Commissioner's Cup

Elimination round

Playoffs

Quarterfinals 

|}

|}
*Team has twice-to-beat advantage. Team #1 only has to win once, while Team #2 has to win twice.

Semifinals 

|}

Finals 

|}
Finals MVP: Paul Lee 
Best Player of the Conference: Calvin Abueva 
Bobby Parks Best Import of the Conference: Arinze Onuaku

2016 PBA Governors' Cup

Elimination round

Playoffs

Quarterfinals 

|}*Team has twice-to-beat advantage. Team #1 only has to win once, while Team #2 has to win twice.

Semifinals 

|}

Finals 

|}
Finals MVP: LA Tenorio 
Best Player of the Conference: Jayson Castro 
Bobby Parks Best Import of the Conference: Allen Durham

Individual awards

Leo Awards

Most Valuable Player: June Mar Fajardo (San Miguel)
Rookie of the Year: Chris Newsome (Meralco)
First Mythical Team:
 Jayson Castro (TNT)
 Terrence Romeo (GlobalPort)
 June Mar Fajardo (San Miguel)
 Calvin Abueva (Alaska)
 Arwind Santos (San Miguel)
Second Mythical Team:
 Alex Cabagnot (San Miguel)
 LA Tenorio (Barangay Ginebra)
 Asi Taulava (NLEX)
 Japeth Aguilar (Barangay Ginebra)
 Sean Anthony (NLEX)
All-Defensive Team:
 Chris Exciminiano (Alaska)
 Chris Ross (San Miguel)
 Marc Pingris (Star)
 Japeth Aguilar (Barangay Ginebra)
 Gabe Norwood (Rain or Shine)
Most Improved Player: Jericho Cruz (Rain or Shine)
Samboy Lim Sportsmanship Award: June Mar Fajardo (San Miguel)

Awards given by the PBA Press Corps
 Scoring Champion: Terrence Romeo (GlobalPort)
 Baby Dalupan Coach of the Year: Leo Austria (San Miguel)
 Mr. Quality Minutes: Jericho Cruz (Rain or Shine)
 Bogs Adornado Comeback Player of the Year: Paul Lee (Rain or Shine)
 Danny Floro Executive of the Year:  Raymund Yu and Terry Que (Rain or Shine)
 Defensive Player of the Year: Chris Ross (San Miguel)
 Order of Merit: Jayson Castro (TNT)
All-Rookie Team
Chris Newsome (Meralco)
Troy Rosario (TNT)
Scottie Thompson (Barangay Ginebra)
Arthur dela Cruz (Blackwater)
Maverick Ahanmisi (Rain or Shine)
All-Interview Team
Yeng Guiao (Rain or Shine)
LA Tenorio (Ginebra)
Paul Lee (Rain or Shine)
Jimmy Alapag (Meralco)
Arwind Santos (San Miguel)
Asi Taulava (NLEX)

Statistics

Individual statistical leaders

Local players

Import players

Individual game highs

Local players

Import players

Team statistical leaders

Cumulative standings
Note: Barako Bull Energy only competed during the Philippine Cup. The franchise was then bought and a new franchise, the Phoenix Fuel Masters, participated in the import-laden conferences. Their records are not combined since they are different franchises.

Elimination rounds

Playoffs

See also
PBA Women's 3×3

References

External links
 PBA Official Website

 
PBA